Hayli Gubbi is a shield volcano located in the Afar Region of Ethiopia. It is the southernmost volcano of the Erta Ale Range.

See also
 List of volcanoes in Ethiopia

References 
 

Mountains of Ethiopia
Shield volcanoes of Ethiopia
Afar Region
Active volcanoes
Polygenetic shield volcanoes